Druzhnaya is a rural locality (a village) and the administrative center of Druzhnensky Selsoviet Rural Settlement, Kurchatovsky District, Kursk Oblast, Russia. Population:

Geography 
The village is located on the Reut River, 44 km south-west of Kursk, 7 km south-west of the district center – the town Kurchatov

 Climate
Druzhnaya has a warm-summer humid continental climate (Dfb in the Köppen climate classification).

Transport 

The rural locality is situated 51 km from Kursk Vostochny Airport, 128 km from Belgorod International Airport and 253 km from Voronezh Peter the Great Airport.

References

Notes

Sources

Rural localities in Kurchatovsky District, Kursk Oblast